Kurungulam Melpathi is a village in the Thanjavur taluk of Thanjavur district, Tamil Nadu, India.

Demographics 

As per the 2001 census, Kurungulam Mekpathi had a total population of 3932 with 2005 males and  1927 females. The sex ratio was 961. The literacy rate was 73.93.

References 

 

Villages in Thanjavur district